Bakary Fofana may refer to:
 Bakary Fofana (politician), Guinea minister for foreign affairs
 Bakary Fofana (boxer) (born 1966), Côte d'Ivoire boxer